Rabén & Sjögren is a book publishing company in Sweden. Since 1998 it has been part of Norstedts förlag.

The publishing focus is on children's and youth literature. Rabén & Sjögren was very successful, publishing the books of Astrid Lindgren. Other authors include Enid Blyton and Jostein Gaarder.

Rabén & Sjögren also published Svenskt författarlexikon ('Dictionary of Swedish Authors'), a bibliobiographical dictionary of Swedish-language authors in ten volumes between 1942 and 1981.

References

External links
Rabén & Sjögren

Book publishing companies of Sweden
Publishing companies established in 1942
1942 establishments in Sweden